West Point is the oldest continuously occupied military post in the United States. Located on the Hudson River in New York, West Point was identified by General George Washington as the most important strategic position in America during the American Revolution. Until January 1778, West Point was not occupied by the military. On January 27, 1778, Brigadier General Samuel Holden Parsons and his brigade crossed the ice on the Hudson River and climbed to the plain on West Point and from that day to the present, West Point has been occupied by the United States Army. It comprises approximately  including the campus of the United States Military Academy, which is commonly called "West Point".

West Point is a census-designated place (CDP) located in the town of Highlands in Orange County, located on the western bank of the Hudson River. The population was 7,341 at the 2020 census. It is part of the New York–Newark–Jersey City, NY–NJ–PA Metropolitan Statistical Area as well as the larger New York–Newark, NY–NJ–CT–PA Combined Statistical Area.

History

West Point (then known as Fort Clinton), was a fortified site during the American Revolutionary War. Originally picked because of the abnormal S-curve in the Hudson River at this point, the defenses of West Point were designed by Polish military engineer Tadeusz Kościuszko, who served as a brigadier general in the Continental Army.

It was staffed by a small garrison of Continental Army Soldiers from early in 1776 through the end of the war. A great iron chain was laid across the Hudson at this point in 1778 in order to prevent British Navy vessels from sailing further up the Hudson River, which was never tested by the British.

The site comprised multiple redoubts, as well as Fort Putnam, situated on a high hill overlooking the river. Named after its builder, Revolutionary War General and engineer Rufus Putnam, the fort is still preserved in its original design.<ref>Hubbard, Robert Ernest. Major General Israel Putnam, pp. 157–8, McFarland & Company, Inc., Jefferson, North Carolina, 2017. .</ref>

In perhaps the most infamous act of treason in American history, General Benedict Arnold attempted to turn the site over to the British Army in 1780 for a bribe consisting of a commission as a brigadier general in the British Army and a cash reward of £20,000 (about $1.3M in 2009 dollars). Arnold's plot failed when British Major John André was captured as a spy by the Americans. Arnold received a decreased cash reward of £6,000 (roughly $350,000) but was commissioned as a brigadier general in the British Army.

After the conclusion of the American Revolution, West Point was used as a storage facility for cannon and other military property used by the Continental Army. For two months in 1784, the United States Army consisted of only about 80 soldiers under the command of Brevet Major John Doughty at West Point.

In 1790, New York merchant and American Revolution patriot Stephen Moore sold his estate (known as "Moore's Folly") to the United States, following an Act of Congress that solidified the sale. At that point, the home on site (known as "Red House") had suffered damages from the American Revolution and had been occupied repeatedly, including as temporary headquarters to George Washington. The United States Military Academy was established at West Point in 1802 and is the nation's oldest service academy. West Point has the distinction of being the longest continuously occupied United States military installation.

In 1937, the West Point Bullion Depository was constructed; in 1988, it became the West Point Mint, as a branch of the United States Mint.

Geography and climate

West Point is located at 41° 23′ 42" N 73° 57' 18" W (41.395° N 73.955° W). West Point and the contiguous village of Highland Falls are on the west bank of the Hudson River.

West Point has a humid continental climate (Köppen Dfa''), with four distinct seasons. Summers are hot and humid, while winters are cold with moderate snowfall.

Demographics

As of the census of 2010, there were 6,763 people, and 685 households residing in the CDP. The population density was 293.4 per square mile (113.3/km2). There were 1,044 housing units at an average density of 42.9/sq mi (16.6/km2). The racial makeup of the CDP was 82.31% white, 9.09% African American, .5% Native American, 3.35% Asian, .15% Pacific Islander, 1.64% from other races, and 2.96% from two or more races. Hispanic or Latino of any race were 6.56% of the population.

There were 685 households, out of which 75.1% had children under the age of 18 living with them, 87.8% were married couples living together, 4.8% had a female householder with no husband present, and 5.7% were non-families. 5.4% of all households were made up of individuals, and none had someone living alone who was 65 years of age or older. The average household size was 3.69.

The age distribution is 16.7% under the age of 18, 51.2% from 18 to 24, 23% from 25 to 44, 3.8% from 45 to 64, and .1% who were 65 years of age or older. The median age was 21 years. For every 100 females, there were 207.3 males. For every 100 females age 18 and over, there were 259.7 males. All of these statistics are typical for military bases.

The median income for a household in the CDP was $56,516, and the median income for a family was $56,364. About 2.0% of families and 2.0% of the population were below the poverty line, including 2.6% of those under age 18 and none of those age 65 or over.

Notable people
Tony Hale, actor
Edith Hoyt, painter
Alfred Thayer Mahan, Naval historian
Ricky Steamboat, professional wrestler
Gore Vidal, author

Transportation
U.S. Route 9W, combined with NY Route 218 run north-south through West Point. New York Route 293 also runs northeast-southwest through the post. Running through the lower portion of the town is U.S. Route 6, combined with the upper extent of the Palisades Interstate Parkway.

The New York Central Railroad well into the 1950s operated several passenger trains a day on the West Shore Railroad through the academy's Gothic style station; both the limited stop trains bound for Albany and the local trains to Newburgh and Kingston made stops at the station. Service finally ended in 1958.

Train station gallery

Education
Highland Falls-Fort Montgomery Central School District is the local school district. James I. O'Neill High School is its high school.

The Department of Defense Education Activity (DoDEA) maintains elementary and middle schools for children of military personnel on-post at USMA, but sends high school aged students who are dependents of on-base military personnel to O'Neill. In March 2022 USMA's contract with O'Neill was renewed.

See also

References

External links

Visit Orange County West Point, NY

Census-designated places in Orange County, New York
Highlands, New York
New York (state) populated places on the Hudson River
Poughkeepsie–Newburgh–Middletown metropolitan area